Joel Baer Falkovich (died in the 1870s) was an early Yiddish Theatre dramatist, literary figure, and supporter of the Haskalah from the Russian Empire.

Biography
Falkovich was born in Dubno, Volhynian Governorate, Russian Empire during the early nineteenth century, although the exact date is uncertain. During his youth he received a full Jewish education and also learned multiple European languages. He soon became an early proponent of the Haskalah (Jewish enlightenment) in Volhynia and pseudonymously published Hebrew language writings. He was said to have a strong command of Hebrew literature and to be an advocate of using it to write about modern, scientific concepts. 

At some point he left Dubno and settled in Odessa. These were published at a time when secular Yiddish literary works were in demand for the first time, and before the Yiddish theatre was fully established as a genre by Avraham Goldfaden. He also translated Philotas by Gotthold Ephraim Lessing into Hebrew, titling it  and publishing it in Odessa in 1868. His letters to Abraham Firkovich were also noted.

At some point he converted to Christianity, although he did not turn against the Jewish population, but appeared at trials to defend them against charges of Blood libel and wrote essays in defense of them. Although his exact date of death is unknown, Zalman Reisen speculated that he died in the 1870s.

References

Dramatists and playwrights from the Russian Empire
Male writers from the Russian Empire
19th-century people from the Russian Empire
Yiddish-language writers
Jews from the Russian Empire
Hebrew-language writers
Ukrainian Jews
19th-century writers from the Russian Empire
1870s deaths
Converts to Christianity from Judaism
Year of death uncertain
Year of birth unknown
19th-century births
People from Dubno
People of the Haskalah